The 2001 British & Irish Lions tour to Australia was a series of matches played by the British & Irish Lions rugby union team in Australia.

The Lions squad was captained by Martin Johnson, the first player to lead the Lions on two tours. The head coach was New Zealander Graham Henry. After winning the first of their matches against Australia, the Lions lost the remaining two matches of the test series. This was the first time that Australia defeated the Lions in a series. The tour was noted for tension between the test squad and the midweek squad as well as controversial newspaper columns written by scrum-halves Matt Dawson and Austin Healey, accusing the coaching staff of poor scheduling and training regimes and lack of team spirit.

Squad

Results

Test series

First test
Jason Robinson scored the first try of the match, putting the Lions up 5–0. Andrew Walker successfully kicked a penalty for Australia's first points. The Lions scored through Dafydd James, which was converted by Wilkinson. The score at half-time was 12–3.

Brian O'Driscoll scored for the Lions in the second half. Wilkinson converted the try before kicking a penalty to make the score 22–3. Scott Quinnell then scored for the Lions, with Wilkinson converting. Walker then scored a try for Australia.

Second test
The second test was played at Colonial Stadium in Melbourne. Wilkinson was successful with two penalty goals, giving the Lions a 6–0 lead. Burke then kicked a penalty goal for Australia. Neil Back scored the first try of the match, giving the Lions an 11–3 lead over Australia. Burke kicked another penalty goal to make the score 11–6 to the Lions.

Joe Roff scored a try for Australia in the second half, making the score 11–11. Burke kicked a penalty goal to give Australia the lead. The score became 21–11 when Roff scored his second try. Wilkinson then kicked a penalty goal to make it 21–14. Burke then scored a try for Australia, making it 29–14. Burke kicked another two penalty goals.

Third test
With the series tied at 1–1, the third test at Stadium Australia in Sydney was the decider and was refereed by New Zealander Paddy O'Brien. The scoring began in the third minute, when Burke successfully kicked a penalty for Australia, giving them a 3–0 lead. Wilkinson, who was under an injury cloud leading up to the match, levelled the scores in the fifth minute with a successful penalty goal. Burke then landed another penalty goal for Australia. Four minutes later, Burke kicked another penalty goal, giving Australia a 9–3 lead. Robinson scored the first try of the match, which was converted by Wilkinson, giving the Lions a 10–9 lead. Daniel Herbert scored Australia's first try which was converted by Burke, giving Australia a 16–10 lead. Wilkinson was successful with a penalty goal that made the score 16–13.

The Lions took the lead in the second half, with Wilkinson crossing the line to score a try and then converting it, giving the Lions a 20–16 lead. Herbert scored his second try in the 49th minute, Burke converted, giving Australia a 23–20 lead. Wilkinson kicked a penalty goal, levelling scores at 23–23. Burke was successful with a subsequent penalty goal five minutes after. Burke kicked another in the 76th minute, to make the score 29–23.

Television coverage
In Australia, Seven Network and Fox Sports jointly televised the British & Irish Lions matches. In the United Kingdom and Ireland, matches were shown on Sky Sports.

External links
Australia 2001 on lionsrugby.com – official website
Australia 2001 on lions-tour.com

2001 rugby union tours
2001
2000–01 in British rugby union
2000–01 in Irish rugby union
2001 in Australian rugby union